Pemiscot may refer to the following places in the United States:

 Pemiscot County, Missouri
 Pemiscot Township, Pemiscot County, Missouri